Rashtriya Jantantrik Dal (National Democratic Party), a political party in India, former when former Union minister and NCP Chhattisgarh state president Vidhya Charan Shukla broke away from the Nationalist Congress Party on February 5, 2004. Shukla was the party president. RAJD merged with Bharatiya Janata Party on March 13, 2004.

Defunct political parties in Chhattisgarh
2004 establishments in Chhattisgarh
Political parties established in 2004
Political parties disestablished in 2004

References